Arthur Judson Scrogin (August 23, 1853–August 19, 1926) was an American farmer and politician.

Scrogin was born in Lexington, Illinois. He went to Shurtleff College and was a farmer. Scrogin served on the McLean County Board of Supervisors and was chairman of the county board. He was a Republican. Scrogin served in the Illinois House of Representatives from 1897 to 1903. Scrogin died at his home in Lexington, Illinois.

Notes

External links

1853 births
1926 deaths
People from Lexington, Illinois
Shurtleff College alumni
Farmers from Illinois
County board members in Illinois
Republican Party members of the Illinois House of Representatives